Fabiola is a genus of the concealer moth family (Oecophoridae). Among these, it belongs to subfamily Oecophorinae.

Species
 Fabiola edithella (Busck, 1907)
 Fabiola lucidella (Busck, 1912)
 Fabiola pokornyi (Nickerl, 1864)
 Fabiola quinqueferella (Walsingham, 1881)
 Fabiola shaleriella (Chambers, 1875)
 Fabiola tecta Braun, 1935

References
  (2002): Markku Savela's Lepidoptera and some other life forms – Fabiola. Version of 2003-DEC-29. Retrieved 2012-MAY-07.

Oecophorinae